is a Canadian-Japanese actor. Baldwin, born in Eba, Naka-ku, Hiroshima, Hiroshima Prefecture, has appeared in many Japanese films, television series, advertisements, and music videos, and also works in Japan as a translator, narrator, and copywriter. In 2005, he appeared in Chousei Kantai Sazer-X in the recurring role of Gordo, assistant to one of the heroes; in an interview with Tokusatsu Newtype, Baldwin stated that he was likely to appear in the fourth entry of the Chouseishin Series, unaware that it would not be continued following Sazer-X. In 2013, Baldwin appeared in Zyuden Sentai Kyoryuger as Ramirez, a former member of the heroes from ancient times. He said he was interested in playing the same role in the Power Rangers counterpart. However, the New Zealand-shot series did not cast him.

Filmography
Ansatsu Kyoushitsu 2nd Season (2016)
Doamayger-D (2015)
Thermae Romae II (2014)
Zyuden Sentai Kyoryuger (2013-2014)
Experimental Detective Totori (2013)
Zyuden Sentai Kyoryuger: It’s Here! Armed on Midsummer Festival!! (2013)
Onna to otoko no nettai (2013)
Fumô chitai (2009)
Quiz Presen Variety: Q sama!! (2009)
428: Shibuya Scramble (2008)
Ohta Hikari no watashi ga souri daijin ni nattara… hisho tanaka (2008)
Purimadamu (2006)
The Last Love Song on This Little Planet (2005)
A Hardest Night!! (2005)
Chôsei kantai seizâ X (2005)
The World’s Astonishing News! (2003-2005)
Godzilla: Final Wars (2004)
Êsu o nerae! Kiseki e no chôsen (2004)
Hakkutsu! Aruaru daijiten (2004)
Eigo de shabera-night (2001-2003)
Bakuryuu Sentai Abaranger Deluxe: Abare Summer Is Freezing Cold (2003)
Spy Sorge (2003)
Love Collage (2003)
Mâbô dôfu no nyôbô (2003)
Good Luck!! (2003)
Godzilla Against Mechagodzilla (2002)
Muscle Heat (2002)
Shiritsu tantei Hama Maiku (2002)
Shenmue II (2001)
Sono toki rekishi ga ugoita (2001)
SPEC: Zero (2013)
Forma (2013)
Gaiji keisatsu (2009)
Boys Over Flowers (2005)
Siberian Express 5 (2005)
Antatchaburu no makimaki de yatte miyô!! (2008)
Miracle Experiences! Unbelievable (2001-2005)
Project X: Chôsensha tachi (2001)
Sanma no Super Karakuri TV (1996)

References

External links
Official profile
Personal website
Official blog

1965 births
Actors from Hiroshima
Japanese people of Canadian descent
Japanese male actors
Canadian male television actors
Living people